Kustoms are modified cars from the 1930s to the early 1960s, done in the customizing styles of that time period. The usage of a "K" for "Kustom" rather than a "C", is believed to have originated with George Barris.

Styling
This style generally consists of, but is not limited to, starting with a 2-door coupe and making changes such as:

 Lowering the suspension
 Chopping down the roof line, (usually chopped more in the rear to give a "raked back" look, B-pillars are also commonly leaned to enhance this look)
 Sectioning and/or channeling the body, (removing a section from the center of the body)
 Certain pieces of side trim are usually removed or "shaved" to make the car look longer, lower and smoother
 Often bits and pieces of trim from other model cars, are cut, spliced and added to give the car a totally new and interesting "line" to lead the eye in the direction that the Kustomizer wishes it to go
 Door handles are also "shaved" as well, and electric solenoids or cables are installed
 Buttons are installed in hidden locations and used to open the doors
 Trunk lids and other pieces of the body can also be altered in this matter.

Lights
The head and tail lights of a true Kustom may or may not be the original ones manufactured with the car. Some popular swaps would be putting Oldsmobile or Buick headlights in another model for example. Headlights, tail lights, antenna(e) are also subject to term and act called "Frenching", where the object is cut from the body, a "box" in the shape of the item is fabricated and welded into the original hole. The part is then installed back into the "Frenching Pocket" giving it a look of being recessed into the body.

Leading
Traditionally, "Lead", (a mixture of 70% lead and 30% tin) is used in bodywork of the area instead of modern polyester fillers or fiberglass, after the metal shaping is done to prepare for paint. "Leading" connotes a true Kustom "Lead Sled", which was started in the 1950s to imply a large, slow lead-filled car that was all flash and could not hold its own at the races. This was sometimes not the case however and certain Kustoms packed some serious punch under the hood. Today, however calling someone's car a "Lead Sled" will generally be taken as a compliment.

Grills and hubcaps
Grills are often changed on lead sleds as well. Some owners use pieces of other grills to Kustomize their own. For example, using a DeSoto grill in a '50 Mercury, or a LaSalle (Cadillac) grill in a '36 Ford, two of the most recognized and classic combinations of all time. "Flipper" style hubcaps are popular on Kustoms, such as '57 Dodge Lancer (4 bars), '56 Oldsmobile Fiesta (3 bars), '59 Dodge lancer or "Crabs" as they are said to resemble a crab, Other such as '57 and '49 Cadillac hubcaps are also acceptable and referred to as "Sombreros", '57 Plymouth "cones", etc. There were also other popular styles that were purely after market and never came factory stock on another car, like "Hollywood" flippers, or "Crossbars" for example.

Tires
It is an unspoken rule of sorts that a Kustom will have whitewall tires, most authentic being bias ply style tires. The width of the whitewall denotes the era that the particular car hearkens to. For example, a Kustom built in a 1940s style will typically have true "wide Whites" which are 3 inches or more in width, where the white rubber extends behind the rim of the wheel, this style is period correct for Kustoms up to the mid 1950s. From the mid to late 1950s, a narrower (but still wide) extending to the rim of the wheel. In 1956, GM had a concept car called "Biscayne" (styling elements that were later used on Corvettes, '57 Chevrolets, and Corvairs).  This car featured some new high-tech looking tires that had only a very thin stripe of whitewall rubber. By 1958, Cadillac starts selling cars with these type of "Skinny Whites" or "Inch walls" they were an instant hit and all the rage with the Kustom Krowd. This style of thinner 1 in, 1.5 in, 1.3 in, 3/8 in, or 5/8 in whitewall continued to be popular into the 1960s and are still common on some newer cars today.

Exhaust pipes
"Lakes pipes" were another Kustom main stay, long or short chrome pipes that run back from behind the front wheels wells. They have either one of three removable end plugs for running flat through with open exhaust. Side pipes are similar but do not include removable plugs, "Bellflower" tips are similar but run from the rear wheel well back under the bumper, a style that emerged in the Bellflower, California area in the early 1960s.

Schools of Kustomizing

This school of Kustomizing is called building a "Stock Component Kustom" where parts from other makes and years are used to alter the appearance of the car.

Mild Kustom
The term "Mild Kustom" refers to a fairly conservative approach to Kustomizing, where the majority of the original beauty and identity of the car are retained.

Full Kustom
A "Full Kustom" refers to a car that has been severely altered from every aspect possible almost every exterior panel is re-shaped, interiors, dash, engine bay, suspension, heavily chromed mechanical components, etc.

Bomb
There is also a third version of a true Kustom, the "Bomb". These were the original Lowriders, which developed back in the 1940s through the 1960s alongside the other types of "Kustoms" These usually were similar to the mild Kustoms in that they emphasize keeping the car as original as possible, but using custom paint, chrome, and often covered with every type of bolt-on period correct accessory possible. Each additional accessory on a Bomb is like having one more little badge of honor. Bombs usually have heavily altered suspensions that incorporate traditional hydraulics setups, (the most authentic use discarded World War II aircraft hydraulic components, which were largely available after the war).  Some use of "Air Bags" are used these days on all genera of Kustoms the suspension height, not traditional but often given a "free pass" in this day and age.

Terminology
These cars can also be referred to as custom cars, leadsleds or sleds. The term kustom is generally used as a signifier that the car was done in the 1950s and early 1960s style as opposed to later more modern styles.

See also
 Kustom Kulture
 Custom car
 Hot rod

References

External links
 Custom car photos

Modified vehicles
Kustom Kulture
Automotive styling features
Visual arts media